is a railway station on the Yamada Line in the city of Miyako, Iwate, Japan, operated by East Japan Railway Company (JR East).

Lines
Rikuchū-Kawai Station is served by the Yamada Line, and is located 73.5 rail kilometers from the terminus of the line at Morioka Station.

Station layout
Rikuchū-Kawai Station has a single side platform serving a single bi-directional track. The station is staffed.

History
Rikuchū-Kawai Station opened on 30 November 1933.  The station was closed from 26 November 1946 to 21 November 1954. The station was absorbed into the JR East network upon the privatization of the Japanese National Railways (JNR) on 1 April 1987.

It became unstaffed on 22 April 2018.

Passenger statistics
In fiscal 2015, the station was used by an average of 36 passengers daily (boarding passengers only).

Surrounding area

Kawai Post Office

See also
 List of railway stations in Japan

References

External links

  

Railway stations in Iwate Prefecture
Rias Line
Railway stations in Japan opened in 1933
Miyako, Iwate